Eckhard Schmittdiel (born 13 May 1960) is a German chess Grandmaster (GM, 1994) who shared 1st place in West Germany Chess Championship (1989).

Biography 

Eckhard Schmittdiel only joined a chess club at the age of 15. He had his first major success in 1984 when he won the Dähne Cup chess tournament. In 1986 he became the North Rhine-Westphalia chess champion. In 1987/88 he won in Augsburg. In 1989 he was at the top of the West Germany Chess Championship in Bad Neuenahr with the same number of points as Vlastimil Hort. The tie-break ended in a draw, so that Hort became champion thanks to the better rating. In 1990 he finished first in Prague together with Romuald Mainka. In 1994 he won in Gausdal, in 1999 and 2000 at the master tournament in Dortmund.

In 1988, he was awarded the FIDE International Master (IM) title and received the FIDE Grandmaster (GM) title six years later.

Most recently, Schmittdiel won the Open chess tournament in Crailsheim in 2009 and the Filderpokal rapid chess tournament in 2010.

Since the Chess Bundesliga season 1989/90 Schmittdiel has played in the German Chess Bundesliga and the 2nd Chess Bundesliga. There he played for the clubs SF Dortmund-Brackel, SG Porz, SV Tübingen 1870, SG Bochum 31, TV Tegernsee, Stuttgarter Schachfreunde, SC Hansa Dortmund and BCA Augsburg.

In addition, he was also active at times in the Austrian Chess Bundesliga for SK Absam.

Chess tournament wins 
 Dähne-Pokal 1984
 North Rhine-Westphalia chess championship 1986
 Bad Neuenahr 1989 (tied with Vlastimil Hort)
 Int. Baunataler Open 1998
 Crailsheimer Open 1998
 Master Chess Tournament Dortmund 1999
 Master Chess Tournament Dortmund 2000
 Tübinger Master Chess Tournament 2001
 Filderpokal 2002
 Int. Open Avoine 2006
 Filderpokal 2007
 Velden Open 2008
 Crailsheimer Open 2009
 Filderpokal 2010
 Dortmund city chess championship 1983 und 2013

Works 
along with Jerzy Konikowski: Modern Benoni - played right, Beyer, Hollfeld 1989 ISBN 3-89168-016-3.

References

External links 

1960 births
Living people
Sportspeople from Dortmund
Chess grandmasters
German chess players